General Willard Gordon Wyman (March 21, 1898 – March 29, 1969) was a senior United States Army officer who served as Commanding General of Continental Army Command from 1956 to 1958.

Military career

Wyman was born in Augusta, Maine. He entered the United States Military Academy in 1917, after the American entry into World War I, and was commissioned as a second lieutenant into the Coastal Artillery Branch, and later transferred to the Cavalry Branch of the United States Army. He attended the United States Army Cavalry School, the United States Army Signal School at Fort Gordon and the United States Army Command and General Staff College. He later served as an instructor at the U.S. Army Cavalry School and on the General Staff of the War Department.

During World War II Wyman served as the Assistant Chief of Staff of IX Corps, and later in 1942 as Deputy Chief of Staff of the China-Burma-India Theater of Operations. From 1942 to 1943 Deputy Chief of Staff Allied Forces Headquarters (AFHQ) before being assigned as Assistant Division Commander (ADC) of the 1st Infantry Division, which took part in the Normandy landings on June 6, 1944 and the subsequent Battle of Normandy that followed. He took command of the 71st Infantry Division from late 1944 to 1945.

During the Korean War Wyman commanded the IX Corps, and after that assignment served as Commander in Chief, Allied Land Forces South-Eastern Europe (NATO) from 1952 to 1954, followed by command of Sixth United States Army from 1954 to 1955. His final assignment was Commander-in-Chief United States Continental Command. He retired from the army in 1958.

Death and burial
Wyman died at Walter Reed Army Medical Center in Washington, D.C. on March 29, 1969, aged 71, and was buried in Arlington National Cemetery. His wife Ethel Megginson Wyman (1896–1986) is buried next to him.

Awards and decorations
Wyman's awards and decorations include the Distinguished Service Cross, the Army Distinguished Service Medal with two oak leaf clusters, the Silver Star, the Legion of Merit, and the Bronze Star Medal with "V" device.

References

External links
United States Army Officers 1939−1945
Generals of World War II

|-

|-

1898 births
1969 deaths
United States Army Coast Artillery Corps personnel
Military personnel from Maine
United States Army generals
Recipients of the Distinguished Service Cross (United States)
Recipients of the Silver Star
Recipients of the Legion of Merit
People from Augusta, Maine
United States Army personnel of the Korean War
Recipients of the Distinguished Service Medal (US Army)
United States Military Academy alumni
Burials at Arlington National Cemetery
United States Army personnel of World War I
United States Army generals of World War II